Argyractis coloralis is a moth in the family Crambidae. It was described by Achille Guenée in 1854 and is found in Madagascar and Mauritius.

References

Acentropinae
Moths of Africa
Moths described in 1854